KCSP-FM (90.3 FM) is a non-commercial radio station located in Casper, Wyoming.  KCSP airs a programming from Pilgrim Radio, a religious radio network based out of Nevada. KCSP serves a number of translator stations throughout the state of Wyoming.

History
The station was assigned the call letters KPGM on October 1, 1992. On September 22, 1993, the station changed its call sign to KCSP.

Signal
Like many other Casper area radio stations and television stations, KCSP's transmitter is located south of town on Casper Mountain. The station can be received in 13 counties of Wyoming. KCSP's studios are located next to the North Platte River in central Casper.

Translators

References

External links

CSP-FM
Contemporary Christian radio stations in the United States
Radio stations established in 1992
Natrona County, Wyoming
1992 establishments in Wyoming